Isaac Vallie-Flagg (born April 8, 1978) is an American mixed martial artist, who formerly competed in the Lightweight division of the Ultimate Fighting Championship. A professional competitor since 2003, he has also formerly competed in Strikeforce, Titan FC, and King of the Cage.

Background
Vallie-Flagg is from Ann Arbor, Michigan and attended Community High School. Troubled growing up, Vallie-Flagg was not active in sports apart from dabbling with lacrosse. After viewing a UFC event, Vallie-Flagg began training in mixed martial arts and Brazilian jiu-jitsu.

Mixed martial arts career

Strikeforce
Vallie-Flagg made his Strikeforce debut against Brian Melancon at Strikeforce: Overeem vs. Werdum winning the bout via split decision.

Vallie-Flagg was scheduled to face Bobby Green at Strikeforce Challengers: Britt vs. Sayers, but he pulled out of the bout on November 11, 2011.

Vallie-Flagg next faced Gesias Cavalcante at Strikeforce: Barnett vs. Cormier. He won the fight via split decision.

Vallie-Flagg was scheduled to face Adriano Martins at Strikeforce: Melendez vs. Healy. However, on September 23, 2012 it was announced that the event was cancelled due to an injury to headliner Gilbert Melendez.

Ultimate Fighting Championship
Following the dissolution of Strikeforce, Vallie-Flagg was brought over to the UFC. In his debut, he faced Yves Edwards on February 2, 2013 at UFC 156. He won the fight split decision.

Vallie-Flagg was expected to face Sam Stout on June 15, 2013 at UFC 161. However, Vallie-Flagg was forced out with a back injury and was replaced by James Krause.

Vallie-Flagg faced Elias Silvério on January 15, 2014 at UFC Fight Night 35. He lost the fight via unanimous decision.

Vallie-Flagg was briefly linked to a bout with Danny Castillo on April 26, 2014 at UFC 172.  However, the UFC removed Vallie-Flagg from the bout in favor of a match up with Takanori Gomi. He lost the fight via unanimous decision.  Despite the loss on the scorecards, Vallie-Flagg was awarded his first Fight of the Night bonus award for the bout.

Vallie-Flagg faced Matt Wiman at UFC Fight Night 57 on November 22, 2014. He lost the back-and-forth fight via unanimous decision, and was subsequently released from the promotion shortly after.

Personal life
Vallie-Flagg has been vocal about his drug addiction, with which he has struggled since a teenager. Eventually in 2018, he was arrested on suspicion of burglary in Albuquerque, New Mexico, carrying drugs and multiple weapons. After he was released from the jail, he sought out for help and has been sober since 2018.

Championships and accomplishments

Mixed martial arts
Ultimate Fighting Championship
Fight of the Night (One time)  vs. Takanori Gomi

Mixed martial arts record

|-
| Win
| align=center| 16–7–1
| Jonathan Gary
| Submission (rear-naked choke)
| Fresquez Productions: Rumble on Route 66 2
| 
| align=center| 1
| align=center| 4:15
| Albuquerque, New Mexico, United States
|
|-
| Loss
| align=center| 15–7–1
| Jason Witt
| DQ (illegal knee)
| Titan FC 34
| 
| align=center| 3
| align=center| 1:54
| Kansas City, Missouri, United States
|
|-
| Win
| align=center| 15–6–1
| Travis Coyle
| Submission (knee and punches)
| Jackson's MMA Series XV
| 
| align=center|1
| align=center|3:52
| Santa Fe, New Mexico, United States
| 
|-
| Loss
| align=center| 14–6–1
| Matt Wiman
| Decision (unanimous)
|UFC Fight Night: Edgar vs. Swanson
|
|align=center|3
|align=center|5:00
| Austin, Texas, United States
| 
|-
| Loss
| align=center| 14–5–1
| Takanori Gomi
| Decision (unanimous)
| UFC 172
| 
| align=center| 3
| align=center| 5:00
| Baltimore, Maryland, United States
| 
|-
| Loss
| align=center| 14–4–1
| Elias Silvério
| Decision (unanimous)
| UFC Fight Night: Rockhold vs. Philippou
| 
| align=center| 3
| align=center| 5:00
| Duluth, Georgia, United States
| 
|-
| Win
| align=center| 14–3–1
| Yves Edwards 
| Decision (split)
| UFC 156
| 
| align=center| 3
| align=center| 5:00
| Las Vegas, Nevada, United States
| 
|-
| Win
| align=center| 13–3–1
| Gesias Cavalcante 
| Decision (split)
| Strikeforce: Barnett vs. Cormier
| 
| align=center| 3
| align=center| 5:00
| San Jose, California, United States
| 
|-
| Win
| align=center| 12–3–1
| Brian Melancon 
| Decision (split) 
| Strikeforce: Overeem vs. Werdum
| 
| align=center| 3
| align=center| 5:00
| Dallas, Texas, United States
| 
|-
| Win
| align=center| 11–3–1
| Danny Rodriguez  
| TKO (knee & punches)
| Jackson's MMA Series 4
| 
| align=center| 2
| align=center| 3:28
| Albuquerque, New Mexico, United States
| 
|-
| Win
| align=center| 10–3–1
| Alejandro Villalobos
| KO (punches) 
| Nemesis Fighting: MMA Global Invasion
| 
| align=center| 3
| align=center| N/A
| Punta Cana, Dominican Republic
| 
|-
| Draw
| align=center| 9–3–1
| Ken Jackson 
| Draw
| C3 Fights: Slammin Jammin Weekend 5
| 
| align=center| 3
| align=center| 5:00
| Newkirk, Oklahoma, United States
| 
|-
| Win
| align=center| 9–3
| Robert Simmons 
| TKO (punches) 
| KOTC: Native Warriors
| 
| align=center| 1
| align=center| 2:48
| Santa Fe, New Mexico, United States
| 
|-
| Win
| align=center| 8–3
| Mike Barreras 
| Decision (unanimous)
| DCMMAS: Duke City MMA Series 2
| 
| align=center| 3
| align=center| 5:00
| Albuquerque, New Mexico, United States
| 
|-
| Win
| align=center| 7–3
| Anselmo Martinez 
| Decision (unanimous)
| Gods of War
| 
| align=center| 3
| align=center| 5:00
| Las Cruces, New Mexico, United States
| 
|-
| Win
| align=center| 6–3
| Adrian Gutierrez  
| TKO (punches) 
| SCA: Duke City Bike and Brawl 2
| 
| align=center| 2
| align=center| N/A
| Albuquerque, New Mexico, United States
| 
|-
| Win
| align=center| 5–3
| Brad Nordquist  
| TKO (punches) 
| KOTC: Badlands
| 
| align=center| 2
| align=center| 0:50
| Albuquerque, New Mexico, United States
| 
|-
| Win
| align=center| 4–3
| Abel Vargas 
| Submission (rear-naked choke)
| KOTC: Hierarchy
| 
| align=center| 1
| align=center| 2:01
| Albuquerque, New Mexico, United States
| 
|-
| Loss
| align=center| 3–3
| Rudy Bears 
| Submission (rear-naked choke)
| FW 15: Rumble at Rt. 66 Casino
| 
| align=center| 1
| align=center| 4:00
| Albuquerque, New Mexico, United States
| 
|-
| Win
| align=center| 3–2
| Ashton Castro 
| Submission (punches)
| YTYT: Ground Um and Pound Um
| 
| align=center| 1
| align=center| 4:15
| Kona, Hawaii, United States
| 
|-
| Loss
| align=center| 2–2
| Patrick Reeves  
| Submission (armbar)
| Knuckle Up Productions: Fight Night
| 
| align=center| 1
| align=center| 1:07
| Santa Fe, New Mexico, United States
| 
|-
| Win
| align=center| 2–1
| Eric Regan 
| Submission (rear-naked choke)
| Knuckle Up Productions: Slugfest 
| 
| align=center| 1
| align=center| 1:23
| Espanola, New Mexico, United States
| 
|-
| Win
| align=center| 1–1
| Danny Wren 
| Decision (unanimous)
| KOTC 35: Acoma
| 
| align=center| 2
| align=center| 5:00
| Acoma, New Mexico, United States
| 
|-
| Loss
| align=center| 0–1
| Ben Schilsler
| Submission (armbar)
| KOTC 26: Gladiator Challenge
| 
| align=center| 1
| align=center| 0:29
| Acoma, New Mexico, United States
|

Bare knuckle record

|-
|Loss
|align=center|3–1
|Luis Palomino
|KO (punches)
|Bare Knuckle FC 11
|
|align=center|1
|align=center|0:45
|Oxford, Mississippi, United States
||Super Welterweight Tournament Final
|-
|Win
|align=center|3-0
|Melvin Guillard
|TKO (hand injury)
|Bare Knuckle FC 7
|
|align=center|3
|align=center|2:00
|Biloxi, Mississippi, United States 
|Guillard was forced to retire after round three due to an injury to his right hand.
|-
|Win
|align=center|2-0
|Randy Hedderick
|TKO (broken hand)
|Bare Knuckle FC 5
|
|align=center|3
|align=center|1:22
|Biloxi, Mississippi, United States
|
|-
|Win
|align=center|1-0
|Cory Simpson
|KO (punches)
|World Bare Knuckle Fighting Federation
|
|align=center|2
|align=center|1:20
|Casper, Wyoming, United States
|
|-

References

External links
 
 

1978 births
Living people
American male mixed martial artists
Lightweight mixed martial artists
Welterweight mixed martial artists
Mixed martial artists utilizing Brazilian jiu-jitsu
Bare-knuckle boxers 
Mixed martial artists from Michigan
Sportspeople from Ann Arbor, Michigan
Ultimate Fighting Championship male fighters
American practitioners of Brazilian jiu-jitsu